Naval Air Station Whiting Field is a United States Navy base located near Milton, Florida, with some outlying fields near Navarre, Florida, in south and central Santa Rosa County, and is one of the Navy's two primary pilot training bases (the other being NAS Corpus Christi, Texas).  NAS Whiting Field provides training for U.S. Navy, U.S. Marine Corps, Coast Guard, and Air Force student pilots, as well as those of several allied nations.  NAS Whiting Field is home to Training Air Wing Five (TRAWING 5).

NAS Whiting Field is actually two airfields sharing a common support base.  Primary Flight Training student aviators fly the Beechcraft T-6 Texan II from North Whiting Field (KNSE) while Advanced Helicopter Training takes place utilizing the TH-57 Sea Ranger at South Whiting Field (KNDZ).

Namesake
Whiting Field is named for Kenneth Whiting, who was commissioned from the United States Naval Academy on 25 February 1908. In 1914 he learned to fly under Orville Wright and was designated Naval Aviator number 16. He assumed command of the 1st Naval Air Unit in France following America's entry into World War I and was subsequently assigned to command Naval Air Stations 14 and 15 at RNAS Killingholme, England. He was awarded the Navy Cross "for exceptionally meritorious service in a duty of great responsibility." After the war he was partially responsible for the conversion of collier Jupiter into the Navy's first aircraft carrier .

Operations
North Field is used solely for T-6 Texan II fixed-wing, primary flight training operations. Students from the United States Navy, Marine Corps, Coast Guard, and Air Force (as well as exchange students from various allied nations) go through the T-6B Joint Primary Aircraft Training System syllabus.

South Field is utilized for United States Navy, Marine Corps, and Coast Guard students in the Advanced Helicopter pipeline, flying the TH-57 Sea Ranger. Upon completion of this syllabus students will become designated Naval Aviators and assigned to their respective Fleet Replacement Squadron.

Squadrons

Outlying Fields

History

Naval Auxiliary Air Station (NAAS) Whiting Field was commissioned on July 16, 1943 by Rear Admiral George D. Murray, Commandant of the Naval Air Training Center, and the widow of Naval Captain Kenneth Whiting, after whom the station was named. During construction, a prisoner of war camp was located at the station, providing additional labor.

Jet trainers first arrived at Whiting Field in early August 1949 when eight TO-1 Shooting Stars transferred from NAS Corpus Christi, Texas as part of a new transitional jet training squadron to commence operations in September 1949, commanded by Lt. Cmdr. V. P. O'Neil, USN. The Blue Angels demonstration team moved its headquarters to Whiting Field from NAS Corpus Christi, Texas, in 1955.

On Friday August 6, 2021 Training Air Wing 5 received the first one of its new training helicopter. This is the Leonardo TH-73A Thrasher of Italian origin.

See also
List of United States Navy airfields
NAS Whiting Field – North (T-6B fixed wing training only)
NAS Whiting Field – South (TH-57 helicopter training only)

References

External links

Whiting Field
Military installations in Florida
Airports in Florida
Buildings and structures in Santa Rosa County, Florida
United States Coast Guard Air Stations
Former census-designated places in Florida
Military Superfund sites
Superfund sites in Florida
1943 establishments in Florida